The 2018 Opportunities Party leadership election was held in New Zealand in December 2018 to determine the future leadership of The Opportunities Party (TOP) political party. The election was won by previous deputy leader Geoff Simmons.

Background 

TOP was founded in November 2016 by wealthy economist Gareth Morgan to advocate for "a prosperous, fair and equitable society". TOP contested the 2017 general election gaining 2.44% of the vote, but won no seats in the New Zealand House of Representatives. Three months after the election, Morgan resigned as leader of the party but said TOP would contest the 2020 election though he would not lead it.

In August 2018, The Opportunities Party appointed a new board and former deputy leader Geoff Simmons was appointed as an interim leader. The new board embarked on a "listening tour" across the country to gauge supporters reactions and future interest. Additionally, a ballot of party members would be conducted to determine a new party leader.

Candidates 
The following party members contested the leadership:
Geoff Simmons, former deputy leader.
Anthony Singh, party member
Amy Stevens, Auckland lawyer (endorsed by Morgan)

Result
The following table gives the members ballot results:

Aftermath 
In addition to Simmons being elected leader, fellow leadership contestant Donna Pokere-Phillips was elected in a concurrent election to serve as TOP's membership representative on the party board. In March 2019 Morgan announced his resignation from TOP altogether, Simmons thanked Morgan for creating the party and his subsequent contributions.

References

2018 elections in New Zealand
Political party leadership elections in New Zealand
The Opportunities Party
December 2018 events in New Zealand
Opportunities Party leadership election